Hinojosa del Valle is a municipality in the province of Badajoz, Extremadura, Spain. It has a population of 557 and an area of 46 km².

References

Municipalities in the Province of Badajoz